Juan Carlos Valdivia Lena (born 10 July 1966) is a Chilean television presenter.

Education 
He studied his secondary education at the Instituto Nacional General José Miguel Carrera. His higher education began when he entered to study literature in Hispanic letters at the Pontificia Universidad Católica de Chile. He then studied law school at the Pontificia Universidad Católica de Valparaíso and finally he attended journalism at the University of Chile, careers. Afterwards, he devoted himself fully to television.

Career 
In 1990, he worked at Extra jóvenes of The Television Network of the University of Chile. Later he became the lead reporter. Around this time, he met Claudia Conserva, then queen of the Miss 17 pageant. The relationship matured to a marriage in 1995.

On August 28, 2004, Juan Carlos "Pollo" Valdivia and his wife Claudia Conserva started a new animated television show called Pollo en Conserva.

References

External Links
 

1968 births
Living people
Chilean people
Instituto Nacional General José Miguel Carrera alumni
Pontifical Catholic University of Chile alumni
Pontifical Catholic University of Valparaíso alumni
University of Chile alumni
Chilean television presenters
Chilean television personalities